Weyhill railway station was a railway station opened by the Midland and South Western Junction Railway in what is now the western suburbs of Andover, Hampshire, England.

History

, the station was the site of a distribution company.

Routes

References

Disused railway stations in Hampshire
Former Midland and South Western Junction Railway stations
Railway stations in Great Britain opened in 1882
Railway stations in Great Britain closed in 1961